Francis or Fran O'Brien may refer to:


Politics
Francis O'Brien (Canadian politician) (born 1927), Canadian politician and farmer
Francis O'Brien (Irish politician) (born 1943), Irish Fianna Fáil politician

Sport
Francis O'Brien (cricketer) (1911–1991), New Zealand cricketer
Fran O'Brien (American football) (1936–1999), American National Football League player
Fran O'Brien (footballer) (born 1955), Irish footballer

Other
Francis O'Brien, executive producer of Gallipoli (1981 film)

See also
Frank O'Brien (disambiguation)